Rovišće is a village and a municipality in Bjelovar-Bilogora County, Croatia. There are 4,822 inhabitants, 1,196 in the village itself, of which 97% are Croats.

References

Municipalities of Croatia
Populated places in Bjelovar-Bilogora County